Patrick J. O'Donnell (died 9 April 2016) was a Scottish academic who was lecturer of psychology at the University of Glasgow. He was born in Govan and died at home in Glasgow, April 2016, after a year-long illness. He was 68 and had taught at the School of Psychology for more than 45 years, teaching circa 25,000 students.

He held positions such as Dean of Social Science, Head of Department, Deputy Head of School and Deputy Director of Teaching until his retirement in 2015. He was a well-known figure for his media commentary, his academic career, as well as a teacher of Psychology students . He was also involved in the UCU.

Personal life
Raised a Roman Catholic, he attended St Aloysius College where he met his wife Mary, and where he was Head Boy and Dux. He is survived by his wife and daughter.

References

Further reading

Scottish psychologists
2016 deaths
People from Govan
Scottish people of Irish descent
Scottish Roman Catholics